The 2010 Lamar Cardinals football season was their first since 1989 and the first for head coach Ray Woodard and his staff. The Cardinals opened up the season on September 4 against arch-rival, #11 McNeese State in Lake Charles. The crowd of 19,235 that filled Cowboy Stadium marked the highest attendance since 2002 for the Cowboys. Lamar quarterback Andre Bevil set a school record for passing yards with 427 yards through the air. The game featured a late fourth quarter surge by the Cardinals with two touch down passes thrown in the final quarter of the game. McNeese clinched the 30–27 victory when they converted on third and 10 with less than a minute left.

Schedule

References

Lamar
Lamar Cardinals football seasons
Lamar Cardinals football